The 2004 Wokingham District Council election took place on 10 June 2004 to elect members of Wokingham Unitary Council in Berkshire, England. The whole council was up for election with boundary changes since the last election in 2003. The Conservative Party stayed in overall control of the council.

Background
Since 2003 boundary changes meant that almost every ward was changed from the previous election with the only ones that remained the same being Charvil, Norreys and Winnersh. The number of wards was also increased from 24 to 25, but the number of seats on the council remaining the same. The boundary changes meant the whole council was up for election for the first time since the unitary authority was founded in 1997. Before the election the Conservatives had 33 seats and had controlled the council since the 2002 election.

Election result
The results saw the Conservatives strengthen their control of the council after gaining 6 seats to hold 39 of the 54 seats. The Liberal Democrats fell back to 15 seats, while Labour lost their only seat on the council. The leader of the Liberal Democrats on the council, Coling Lawley, only survived the election by 4 votes in Coronation ward after 3 recounts. Overall turnout was 40.3% a rise of over 10% from the 2003 election.

Ward results

References

2004 English local elections
2004
2000s in Berkshire